Symbio Wildlife Park is a privately owned medium sized zoo located in Helensburgh, New South Wales, south of Sydney and in close proximity to the City of Wollongong.
Beginning in 1975 as a native Australian wildlife park, Symbio later expanded its holdings with a number of different animals from other countries also, and has contributed to conservation work and captive breeding programs for both
Australian and exotic animals. In 2021 the park established specialty built captive-breeding facilities for native vulnerable and endangered Bellinger River snapping turtles, Manning River snapping turtles and Stuttering frogs.
Among Symbio's animal residents is an albino echidna named Leo.

Incidents 
In March 2022, a red panda named Kesari was put down after escaping from the park and being hit by a vehicle after a tree fell.

References

External links
 

Zoos in New South Wales
Wildlife parks in Australia
1975 establishments in Australia
Zoos established in 1975
Tourist attractions in Sydney
Tourist attractions in Wollongong
Helensburgh, New South Wales